Ankertorget was a market square  located in the city centre of Oslo, Norway. The property site lies between Torggata, Storgata, Hausmannsgate and the Akerselva.

Ankertorget was developed between 1880–1882 and named after 18th century merchant, timber trader, and shipowner Christian Anker (1711–1765). For many years there were storage tanks on the property, which secured gas supply to many homes in the area. From the 1920s until the early 1970s, the site had a terminal for bus routes to Oslo's southern and eastern surrounds.  In the 1970s the market became a construction site. At that same time,  office and retail space were developed along Storgata  and Hausmannsgate. Ankertorget was re-developed with Anker studentbolig which provides housing for vocational school students. On site, there is also Anker Hostel and Anker Hotel .

References

External links
Anker Studentbolig website
Hotel Oslo website
Squares in Oslo
Grünerløkka